Spatlo (also spelled sphatlo,  and sphatlho) is a South African street food popular in all provinces of South Africa, especially Gauteng. Also known as kota.

It is made from a hollowed out quarter loaf of bread and filled with a variety of ingredients, often potato chips, sausage, egg, beef patty, cheese, polony and atchar. The name kota, used in areas such as Soweto and Johannesburg, is derived from the English word quarter, referring to the size of the bread loaf. The name sphatlo, used in areas such as Pretoria, Soshanguve, Attredgeville and Mamelodi).

Spaza shops sell popular street food, including spatlo. Spaza shops are the backbone of township economy.

Spaza shops that sell this popular street food normally set minimum prices at ZAR(R)10 ranging over to ZAR(R)200 depending on the size and ingredients inside,customers largely scholars and low income individuals in general because it's the cheapest alternative to Burgers and this meal is largely available in every area across the country (it's a rare occasion where it won't be available for sale in any given area across South Africa),Sphatlo  is considered a stable junk food in South Africa and best goes well with a soft drink, most people preferring Coca-Cola beverages as a buddy for the meal.

Gauteng
South African cuisine
Sandwiches